The inland broad-blazed slider (Lerista nichollsi) is a species of skink found in Western Australia.

References

Lerista
Reptiles described in 1933
Taxa named by Arthur Loveridge